Seladelpar (developmental code names MBX-8025, RWJ-800025) is a PPARδ receptor agonist that is being investigated for drug use by Metabolex. According to a press release they are examining its potential use for the treatment of dyslipidemia, metabolic syndrome, type 2 diabetes, and non-alcoholic steatohepatitis (NASH). The compound was licensed from Janssen Pharmaceutica NV.

See also
 Elafibranor
 GW501516
 Peroxisome proliferator-activated receptor

References

External links
 Seladelpar - AdisInsight

Carboxylic acids
Experimental drugs
PPAR agonists
Trifluoromethyl compounds